Pieter van Dam (21 May 1904 – 11 February 1985) was a Dutch gymnast. He competed in seven events at the 1928 Summer Olympics.

References

1904 births
1985 deaths
Dutch male artistic gymnasts
Olympic gymnasts of the Netherlands
Gymnasts at the 1928 Summer Olympics
Gymnasts from The Hague